Cindana Hartono Kusuma (born 8 June 1976) is a retired Indonesian badminton player in the 90s and early 2000s. She won the women's singles gold medal at the 1999 Southeast Asian Games, and was part of the Indonesian women's winning team at the 1999 and 2001 Southeast Asian Games.

Career 
Hartono Kusuma managed to steal the attention during the 1997 India Open tournament by defeating the Korean player Lee Soon-deuk with a score of 11–6, 11–4, Kusuma was then trusted to strengthen Indonesian women's team in the 1998 Uber Cup in Hong Kong. Kusuma was again given the trust to compete in the 1999 Southeast Asian Games, where she managed to become the champion in the women's singles by defeating Sujitra Ekmongkolpaisarn with a score of 11–5, 11–2. Kusuma also managed to become the champion in the women's team with her friends by beating Thailand with a 3–0 aggregate score. Kusuma also won the Swiss Open by defeating Yasuko Mizui of Japan in the final with a score of 7–11, 11–6, 13–10. Entering the early 2000s. Hartono Kusuma was predicted as a substitute for Mia Audina in the 2000 Uber Cup who moved to the Netherlands, but Kusuma got injured.

Achievements

Southeast Asian Games 
Women's singles

IBF World Grand Prix (2 titles) 
The World Badminton Grand Prix has been sanctioned by the International Badminton Federation from 1983 to 2006.

Women's singles

 IBF Grand Prix tournament
 IBF Grand Prix Finals tournament

References

External links 
 

1976 births
Living people
sportspeople from Jakarta
Indonesian female badminton players
Badminton players at the 1998 Asian Games
Asian Games bronze medalists for Indonesia
Asian Games medalists in badminton
Medalists at the 1998 Asian Games
Competitors at the 1999 Southeast Asian Games
Competitors at the 2001 Southeast Asian Games
Southeast Asian Games gold medalists for Indonesia
Southeast Asian Games medalists in badminton
21st-century Indonesian women
20th-century Indonesian women